Lincoln Township is a township in Johnson County, Iowa, USA.

History
Lincoln Township was organized in 1870.

References

Townships in Johnson County, Iowa
Townships in Iowa
1870 establishments in Iowa